Ahmed Brahim (born 1945) is a convicted al-Qaeda member from Algeria. Spanish authorities arrested him in 2002 on charges that he was a chief financier for al-Qaeda in Spain. He is also alleged to have been a planner in the bombing of two US embassies in Kenya and Tanzania in 1998. Brahim is married to a Finnish national identified as Pirjo. Spanish counter-terrorism judge Baltasar Garzón has also alleged that Ahmed Brahim had "routine contacts" with Swiss-born Islamic scholar Tariq Ramadan in 1999.

References

External links
Official site of Ahmed Brahim
Spain holds al-Qaeda finance suspect
Spain Arrests Suspected al Qaeda Financial Chief
Why Revoke Tariq Ramadan's U.S. Visa?

Algerian al-Qaeda members
Living people
1945 births
Algerian people imprisoned abroad
Prisoners and detainees of Spain
People imprisoned on charges of terrorism
21st-century Algerian people